The Hatch Act of 1939, An Act to Prevent Pernicious Political Activities, is a United States federal law. Its main provision prohibits civil service employees in the executive branch of the federal government, except the president and vice president, from engaging in some forms of political activity. It became law on August 2, 1939. The law was named for Senator Carl Hatch of New Mexico. It was most recently amended in 2012.

Background
Widespread allegations that local Democratic Party politicians used employees of the Works Progress Administration (WPA) during the congressional elections of 1938 provided the immediate impetus for the passage of the Hatch Act. Criticism centered on swing states such as Kentucky, Tennessee, Pennsylvania, and Maryland. In Pennsylvania, Republicans and dissident Democrats publicized evidence that Democratic politicians were consulted on the appointment of WPA administrators and case workers and that they used WPA jobs to gain unfair political advantage. In 1938, a series of newspaper articles exposed WPA patronage, and political contributions in return for employment, prompting an investigation by the Senate Campaign Expenditures Committee, headed by Sen. Morris Sheppard, a Texas Democrat.

Despite that investigation's inconclusive findings, many in both parties determined to take action against the growing power of the WPA and its chief administrator, Harry Hopkins, an intimate of President Franklin Roosevelt. The Act was sponsored by Senator Carl Hatch, a Democrat from New Mexico. At the time, Roosevelt was struggling to purge the Democratic party of its more conservative members, who were increasingly aligned with the administration's Republican opponents. The president considered vetoing the legislation or allowing it to become law without his signature, but instead signed it on the last day he could do so. His signing message welcomed the legislation as if he had called for it, and emphasized the protection his administration would provide for political expression on the part of public employees.

Provisions
The 1939 Act forbids the intimidation or bribery of voters and restricts political campaign activities by federal employees. It prohibits using any public funds designated for relief or public works for electoral purposes. It forbids officials paid with federal funds from using promises of jobs, promotion, financial assistance, contracts, or any other benefit to coerce campaign contributions or political support. It provides that persons below the policy-making level in the executive branch of the federal government must not only refrain from political practices that would be illegal for any citizen, but must abstain from "any active part" in political campaigns, using this language to specify those who are exempt:
 (i) an employee paid from an appropriation for the Executive Office of the President; or
 (ii) an employee appointed by the President, by and with the advice and consent of the Senate, whose position is located within the United States, who determines policies to be pursued by the United States in the nationwide administration of Federal laws.

The act also precludes federal employees from membership in "any political organization which advocates the overthrow of our constitutional form of government", a provision meant to prohibit membership in organizations on the far left and far right, such as the Communist Party USA and the German-American Bund.

An amendment on July 19, 1940, extended the Act to certain employees of state and local governments whose positions are primarily paid for by federal funds. It has been interpreted to bar political activity on the part of employees of state agencies administering federal unemployment insurance programs and appointed local law enforcement agency officials with oversight of federal grant funds. The Hatch Act bars state and local government employees from running for public office if any federal funds support the position, even if the position is funded almost entirely with local funds.

The Merit Systems Protection Board and the Office of Special Counsel (OSC) are responsible for enforcement of the Hatch Act. During the Trump administration, watchdog group CREW claimed the White House or the OSC overlooked apparent Hatch Act violations until groups like CREW or government whistleblowers filed official complaints.

Supreme Court challenges

The Supreme Court has several times declined to hear challenges to the act and has twice upheld its constitutionality. In a 1947 case brought by the CIO, a divided court found that Congress had properly exercised its authority as long as it had not affected voting rights. Justice William O. Douglas objected to the assertion that "clean politics" required the act's restrictions: "it would hardly seem to be imperative to muzzle millions of citizens because some of them, if left to their constitutional freedoms, might corrupt the political process." In 1973, in a case brought by the National Association of Letter Carriers, a 6 to 3 decision found the act neither too broad nor unclear. The court's three most liberal justices, Douglas, William J. Brennan, and Thurgood Marshall, dissented. Douglas wrote: "It is no concern of government what an employee does in his or her spare time, whether religion, recreation, social work or politics is his hobby, unless what he or she does impairs efficiency or other facets of the merits of his job."

Amendments
In 1975, the House passed legislation allowing federal employees to participate in partisan elections and run for office, but the Senate took no action. In 1976, Democrats who controlled Congress had sought to win support by adding protections against the coercion of employees by their superiors and federal employee unions had supported the legislation. It passed the House on a vote of 241 to 164 and the Senate on a vote of 54 to 36. President Ford vetoed the legislation on April 12. He noted that coercion could be too subtle for the law to eliminate and that the Supreme Court had said in 1973 that the Hatch Act had achieved "a delicate balance between fair and effective government and the First Amendment rights of individual employees." President Carter proposed similar legislation in 1977.

A proposed amendment to permit federal workers to participate in political campaigns passed the House on a 305 to 112 vote in 1987. In 1990, a similar bill passed the House on a vote of 334 to 87 and the Senate on a vote of 67 to 30. President George H. W. Bush vetoed the legislation, which the House voted to override 327 to 93  and the Senate sustained on a vote of 65 to 35, with 55 Democrats and 10 Republicans voting to override and 35 Republicans supporting the president's veto.

In 1993 the advocates for removing or modifying restrictions on the political activities of federal employees succeeded in enacting the Hatch Act Reform Amendments of 1993 (107 Stat. 1001) that removed the prohibition on participation in "political management or political campaigns." Federal employees are still forbidden to use their authority to affect the results of an election. They are also forbidden to run for office in a partisan election, to solicit or receive political contributions, and to engage in political activities while on duty or on federal property.

President Barack Obama signed the Hatch Act Modernization Act of 2012 on December 28, 2012. It modified penalties under the Hatch Act to allow for disciplinary actions in addition to removal for federal employees; clarified the applicability to the District of Columbia of provisions that cover state and local governments; limited the prohibition on state and local employees running for elective office to employees whose salary is paid completely by federal loans or grants.

Applicability to U.S. uniformed service personnel
The Hatch Act does not apply to military members of the uniformed services of the United States, although it does apply to Department of Defense civil servants, as well as Department of Homeland Security civil servants in direct support of the United States Coast Guard. Members of the U.S. Armed Forces are subject to Department of Defense Directive 1344.10 (DoDD 1344.10), Political Activities by Members of the Armed Forces, and the spirit and intent of that directive is effectively the same as that of the Hatch Act for Federal civil servants. By agreement between the Secretary of Defense and the Secretary of Homeland Security, DoDD 1344.10 also applies to uniformed personnel of the Coast Guard at all times, whether it is operating as a service in the Department of Homeland Security or as part of the Navy under the Department of Defense. As a directive, DoDD 1344.10 is considered to be in the same category as an order or regulation, and military personnel violating its provisions can be considered in violation of Article 92 (Failure to obey order or regulation) of the Uniform Code of Military Justice.

Members of the United States Public Health Service Commissioned Corps are subject to specific Health and Human Service regulations found in Title 44, Code of Federal Regulations Part 73 Subpart F. Hatch Act guidelines for NOAA Corps Officers are provided by United States Department of Commerce, Office of the General Counsel, Ethics Law and Program Division. Career members of the Senior Executive Service, administrative law judges, and National Oceanic and Atmospheric Administration Corps officers are all subject to Hatch Act restrictions and have additional limitations on their off-duty political activities.

Recent Hatch Act incidents

Bush Administration

 In 2006, the Utah Democratic Party challenged the candidacy of Ogden City Police Chief Jon Greiner for State Senate. The challenge was upheld by the  U.S. OSC because the year prior the Ogden City Police Department received a federal grant to help pay for bulletproof vests. Jon Greiner appealed the decision, remained on the ballot, won the election and served one term (2006–2010) as Utah State Senator while the results of the appeal were unknown.
 In January 2007, the OSC announced the results of investigations into whether certain events during the election campaigns of 2004 and 2006 violated the Hatch Act.
 It found no violation when Kennedy Space Center officials allowed Senator John Kerry's presidential campaign to use a NASA facility for a 2004 campaign event, because no government employees worked at the facility in question. It found streaming the event to NASA employees and contractors violated the Hatch Act.
 It reviewed a 2006 speech by NASA Administrator Dr. Michael D. Griffin in which he appeared to endorse Representative Tom DeLay for re-election. It determined that he "should have exercised better judgment" and took no further action.
 In June 2007, the OSC found that Lurita Alexis Doan, Administrator of the General Services Administration, violated the Hatch Act when she took part in a video conference with Karl Rove and other White House officials, and sent letters asking how to help Republican politicians get elected.
 In December 2007, Vigo County Superior Court Judge David Bolk ruled that the mayor-elect of Terre Haute (Indiana) Duke Bennett was covered by the Hatch Act when he was candidate for mayor because he had been director of operations for the Hamilton Center (a medical facility) when he ran for mayor, and the Hamilton Center was receiving federal funding for its Head Start program. Nevertheless Bennett was allowed to take office, because Judge Bolk ruled that the legal challenge had been brought too late to prevent this. In November 2008 "Indiana Court of Appeals in a 2–1 decision found that the Hatch Act did apply to Bennett and called for a special election to fill the office of Terre Haute mayor." In June 2009, Indiana Supreme Court ruled that Bennett could remain in office because the challenge had been brought by Bennett's opponent after the election, and therefore Bennett was no longer a candidate, but mayor-elect at the time and was no longer in violation of the act.
 On May 6, 2008, FBI agents raided OSC offices and the home office of its director, Scott Bloch. The raids related to an investigation into allegations that Bloch's office had attempted to obstruct justice by hiring an outside company to delete computer files beyond recovery in order to prevent authorities from proving Bloch had violated the Hatch Act by retaliating against whistle-blowers in his office, an independent U.S. government agency "charged with protecting the rights of government whistle-blowers".

Obama Administration
 On September 13, 2012, the OSC charged Health and Human Services Secretary Kathleen Sebelius with violating the Hatch Act by making a political speech during an official government event. Sebelius later said she had made a mistake and that the error was "technical" in nature.
 On July 18, 2016, the OSC concluded that Housing and Urban Development Secretary Julian Castro violated the Hatch Act during an interview with Katie Couric.  Castro admitted the violation, but denied any intent to violate the act.
 On October 30, 2016, U.S. Senate Democratic Minority Leader Harry Reid stated that FBI Director James Comey may have violated the Hatch Act by sending a letter to the Congress on October 28, 2016, which stated that the FBI would be reopening its investigation of the Hillary Clinton email controversy. Also on October 30, Richard Painter, a chief White House ethics lawyer for the George W. Bush administration, published an op-ed saying that he had filed a complaint against the FBI with the OSC and with the Office of Government Ethics about the same matter.
 In November 2016, two San Francisco Bay Area federal employees who were elected to school boards were told that they would have to resign their federal positions in order to serve on the boards, as their running for a non-partisan seat that had party political involvement contravened the Hatch Act. Both Jerrold Parsons, President of the John Swett Unified School District, and Ana Galindo-Marrone, Vice Mayor of Pacifica, chose not to serve in order to retain their federal jobs.

Trump Administration
 In June 2017, the OSC issued a warning to White House Deputy Chief of Staff for Communications Dan Scavino Jr. for an April 2017 tweet that Scavino sent advocating for a primary challenge against U.S. Representative Justin Amash.
 In October 2017, the OSC issued a warning to United States Ambassador to the United Nations Nikki Haley over a June 2017 tweet that she retweeted from President Donald Trump endorsing Republican Congressional candidate Ralph Norman.
 In November 2017, former Office of Government Ethics head Walter Shaub filed a complaint against White House counselor Kellyanne Conway charging that her opposition to Roy Moore opponent Doug Jones during a segment on Fox and Friends violated the Hatch Act. In March 2018, the OSC announced that Conway violated the Hatch Act on that occasion and one other.
In February 2018, FCC Commissioner Michael O'Rielly, in a speech at the Conservative Political Action Conference, "advocated for the reelection of President Trump in his official capacity as FCC Commissioner".
 In September 2018, the OSC issued a warning letter to Stephanie Grisham, the Press Secretary and Communications Director for the First Lady of the United States, for violating the act by including Trump's campaign slogan in a post on her government Twitter account.
 In November 2018, the OSC ruled that six Trump administration officials violated the Hatch Act in posts to their government Twitter accounts, but declined to take disciplinary action. The OSC warned the officials—Raj Shah, deputy press secretary; Jessica Ditto, deputy director of communications; Madeleine Westerhout, executive assistant to the president; Helen Aguirre Ferré, former director of media affairs; Alyssa Farah, press secretary for the vice president; and Jacob Wood, deputy communications director of the Office of Management and Budget—that future infractions would be interpreted as willful violations subject to further action.
 In June 2019, the OSC sent a letter to President Trump recommending that White House counselor Kellyanne Conway be removed from federal service for repeatedly violating the Hatch Act. This report follows the March 2018 OSC finding that Conway was a "repeat offender" for disparaging Democratic presidential candidates while in her official capacity during televised interviews and on social media. President Trump, when asked at a press conference, stated he thought the provision violated her free speech rights.
In August 2020, Department of Agriculture secretary Sonny Perdue supported the president's re-election while promoting the Farmers to Families Food Box Program; Perdue was fined for violating the Hatch Act.
 In August 2020, President Trump announced that, as a result of the COVID-19 pandemic in the United States, and the move of the 2020 Republican National Convention to a largely online format, he would make his speech accepting the Republican Party nomination for the presidential election from the South Lawn of the White House. In response, the OSC sent a letter to President Trump indicating that, while both the President and Vice-President are not covered by the terms of the Hatch Act, White House staffers are, and would therefore not be able to assist with such an address. Moreover, other portions of the Convention included clips recorded at the White House (e.g. an interview with freed hostages, and a naturalization ceremony ). While Republicans argued that the South Lawn forms part of the President's residence, and therefore should not be classed as part of a federal building, legal experts point out that "[i]t's still illegal under the Hatch Act for any White House staffer to participate in executing a campaign photo op/video segment in the White House". This could also lead to investigations for staffers that may have aided Secretary of State Mike Pompeo (but not Pompeo himself) in his convention activities as he delivered a speech while on official business in Jerusalem.
 As of mid-October 2020, 14 members of the Trump administration had been accused by Citizens for Responsibility and Ethics in Washington of Hatch Act violations to promote the incumbent's re-election. By the beginning of November it was up to 16. Senator Elizabeth Warren's staff released a report in which they "counted more than 54 violations of the Hatch Act by 14 administration officials dating back to 2017, as well as nearly 100 additional pending investigations for alleged violations by 22 officials."
 On November 5, 2020, the United States Office of Special Counsel opened an investigation into the campaign's use of the White House for campaign purposes. In January 2021, emails from before the election were reported to feature a "top" Interior department official instructing staff to reference the president's account in each post on social media.

Biden Administration
 In March 2021, Housing and Urban Development Secretary Marcia Fudge violated the Hatch Act by signaling support for Democratic candidates for the upcoming 2022 Ohio Senate election. Secretary Fudge received a warning from the Office of Special Counsel for the comments, which said, "If in the future she engages in prohibited political activity we will consider such activity to be a willful and knowing violation of the law that could result in further action."
 In October 2021, White House Press Secretary Jen Psaki was alleged to have violated the Hatch Act by the watchdog Citizens for Responsibility and Ethics in Washington after she indicated that President Joe Biden supported the candidacy of Democrat Terry McAuliffe in the 2021 Virginia gubernatorial election. The watchdog had previously warned, in a letter to the Biden Administration, that Psaki's statement of support in February 2021 for California Governor Gavin Newsom in the 2021 California gubernatorial recall election, while not a Hatch Act violation since the election was not yet certain to occur, was "closer than necessary to the situations the Hatch Act does contemplate".
 In March 2022, President Biden fired Herschel Walker and Mehmet Oz from their positions on the President's Council on Sports, Fitness, and Nutrition due to the two being active Republican United States Senate candidates. The terminations were a result of potential Hatch Act violations, as well as a Biden administration policy against allowing federal candidates to serve on presidential boards.

Agencies and employees prohibited from engaging in partisan political activity
Employees of the following agencies (or agency components), or in the following categories, are subject to more extensive restrictions on their political activities than employees in other departments and agencies.
 Administrative law judges (positions described at )
 Central Intelligence Agency
 Contract Appeals Boards (positions described at )
 Criminal Division (Department of Justice)
 Defense Intelligence Agency
 Federal Bureau of Investigation
 Federal Election Commission
 Merit Systems Protection Board
 National Geospatial-Intelligence Agency
 National Security Agency
 National Security Council
 Office of Criminal Investigation (Internal Revenue Service)
 Office of Investigative Programs (Customs Service)
 Office of Law Enforcement (Bureau of Alcohol, Tobacco, Firearms and Explosives)
 United States Office of Special Counsel
 Secret Service
 Senior Executive Service
 Employees identified at (b)(2)(B)-(3)

Additionally, one of the early consequences of the act, were disparate court rulings in union busting cases which forbade the use of voter information from initiative and recall petitions for any purposes outside the intended elections.

Current restrictions

Permitted candidacies
Federal employees are allowed to be candidates in non-partisan elections, meaning where no candidates are identified by political party. This type of election is used by most municipalities and school boards in the United States.

They are also allowed to be independent candidates in partisan elections for offices of certain localities where most voters are federal employees, as designated by the Office of Personnel Management:
District of Columbia
In Maryland: Anne Arundel, Calvert, Frederick, Howard, Montgomery, Prince George's and St. Mary's counties; and municipalities of Annapolis, Berwyn Heights, Bethesda, Bladensburg, Bowie, Brentwood, Capitol Heights, Cheverly, Chevy Chase, Chevy Chase Section Three, Chevy Chase View, Chevy Chase Village, College Park, Cottage City, District Heights, Edmonston, Fairmount Heights, Forest Heights, Garrett Park, Glen Echo, Glenarden, Greenbelt, Hyattsville, Kensington, Landover Hills, Martin's Additions, Morningside, Mount Rainier, New Carrollton, North Beach, North Brentwood, North Chevy Chase, Northwest Park, Riverdale Park, Rockville, Seat Pleasant, Somerset, Takoma Park, University Park and Washington Grove
In Virginia: Arlington, Fairfax, Fauquier, King George, Loudoun, Prince William, Spotsylvania and Stafford counties; cities of Alexandria, Fairfax, Falls Church, Manassas, Manassas Park and Portsmouth; and towns of Clifton, Herndon and Vienna
Other municipalities: Anchorage, Alaska; Huachuca City and Sierra Vista, Arizona; Benicia, California; Centerville and Warner Robins, Georgia; Crane, Indiana; New Johnsonville and Norris, Tennessee; Elmer City, Bremerton and Port Orchard, Washington

See also
 Office of Personnel Management
 Smith Act
 House Un-American Activities Committee

References

Further reading

External links
 Discussion of Hatch Act on federal, state, and local government employees by the U. S. Office of Special Counsel
 Hatch Act: Candidacy for Office by Federal Employees in the Executive Branch Congressional Research Service
 Hatch Act Text

1939 in American law
1940 in American law
Civil service in the United States
Civil service reform in the United States
Anti-communism in the United States
Legal history of the United States
United States federal government administration legislation
76th United States Congress